Cory E. Geason (born: August 12, 1975, in Louisiana) is a former American football player in the NFL.

Playing career

College career
Geason played collegiately 
at Tulane University.

Professional career
Geason played tight end in the NFL with the Pittsburgh Steelers from 2000 to 2001 and with the Buffalo Bills in 2002. Geason caught three passes with the Steelers for 66 yards.

References

External links
 ''Database Football: Cory Geason statistics

1975 births
Living people
American football tight ends
Tulane Green Wave football players
Amsterdam Admirals players
Buffalo Bills players
Pittsburgh Steelers players